Oleiny Linares Napoles (born 9 May 1983), is a Cuban Woman Grandmaster (WIM) chess player.

She was the champion of women's chess Cuba in February 2010 and runner-up in 2011, and was the winner of the Cuba junior women's championship in 2003.
She won in the Pan-American University Tournament in 2009 and participated representing Cuba in the Chess Olympiad twice, in the years 2008 and 2010.

References 

1983 births
Living people
Cuban chess players
Chess woman grandmasters
Cuban female chess players
Chess Olympiad competitors
People from Havana